Giorgia Latini is an Italian politician. She was elected to be a deputy to the Parliament of Italy in the 2018 Italian general election for the Legislature XVIII of Italy.

Career
Latini was born on April 18, 1980 in Fabriano.

She was elected to the Italian Parliament in the 2018 Italian general election, to represent the district of Marche for Lega Nord.

References

Living people
21st-century Italian women politicians
Lega Nord politicians
1980 births
People from Fabriano